Paracaedicia is a genus of bush cricket in the subfamily Phaneropterinae. Species can be found mostly in New Guinea.

Species
The Orthoptera Species File and Catalogue of Life list:
Paracaedicia centrifera Bolívar, 1902
Paracaedicia disjuncta Karny, 1926
Paracaedicia femorata Bolívar, 1902
Paracaedicia melanocondylea Bolívar, 1902
Paracaedicia nigropunctata Brunner von Wattenwyl, 1891
Paracaedicia novata Brunner von Wattenwyl, 1898
Paracaedicia obesa Brunner von Wattenwyl, 1891
Paracaedicia planicollis Brunner von Wattenwyl, 1891
Paracaedicia proxima Bolívar, 1902
Paracaedicia raroramosa Brunner von Wattenwyl, 1891
Paracaedicia serrata Brunner von Wattenwyl, 1891
Paracaedicia spinosa Brunner von Wattenwyl, 1891
Paracaedicia tibialis Brunner von Wattenwyl, 1891 - type species (locality Key Island, New Guinea)
Paracaedicia verrucosa Brunner von Wattenwyl, 1891

References

External links

Orthoptera genera
Tettigoniidae
Orthoptera of Asia